Bunnvale is an unincorporated community located within Lebanon Township, Hunterdon County, New Jersey, United States.

The Raritan River and the Ken Lockwood Gorge Wildlife Management Area are located east of Bunnvale.

Notable people
People who were born in, residents of, or otherwise closely associated with Bunnvale include:
 Mary Decker (born 1958), middle-distance runner in National Track and Field Hall of Fame

References

Lebanon Township, New Jersey
Unincorporated communities in Hunterdon County, New Jersey
Unincorporated communities in New Jersey